The Human Factor is a 2013 Italian neo-noir film directed by Bruno Oliviero. It entered the competition at the 2013 Locarno International Film Festival.

Plot summary

Cast  
 Silvio Orlando as Inspector Monaco
 Giuseppe Battiston as Levi
 Sandra Ceccarelli as Miss Ullrich
 Alice Raffaelli as Linda Monaco

References

External links
 
 

2013 films
Italian crime films
2013 crime films
2013 directorial debut films
Italian neo-noir films
2010s Italian films